Quazinone (Dozonone) is a cardiotonic and vasodilator drug which was developed and marketed in the 1980s for the treatment of heart disease. It acts as a selective PDE3 inhibitor. It is no longer available.

See also 
 Phosphodiesterase inhibitor

References

External links

Chloroarenes
Imidazoquinazolines
Inotropic agents
Lactams
PDE3 inhibitors
Vasodilators